Curry is an unincorporated community in Twin Falls County, Idaho, United States, roughly  west of Twin Falls. Curry is located along U.S. Route 30.

Curry is part of the Twin Falls, Idaho Metropolitan Statistical Area.

See also

References

Unincorporated communities in Idaho
Unincorporated communities in Twin Falls County, Idaho